Pedro Luís may refer to:

 Pedro Luís e a Parede, Brazilian musical group
 Pedro Luís Pereira de Sousa, Brazilian poet and politician
 Prince Pedro Luiz of Orleans-Braganza, Brazilian prince

See also